Benjamin Watson Hubbard (November 16, 1842 in Cleveland, Ohio – November 2, 1904 in Evansville, Wisconsin) was a member of the Wisconsin State Assembly

Career
Hubbard was elected to the Assembly in 1892. Additionally, he was Assessor of Union, Rock County, Wisconsin in 1890 and a member of the county board of Rock County, Wisconsin in 1891 and 1892. He was a Republican.

References

External links
Find A Grave

Politicians from Cleveland
People from Union, Rock County, Wisconsin
County supervisors in Wisconsin
Republican Party members of the Wisconsin State Assembly
1842 births
1904 deaths
Burials in Wisconsin
People from Evansville, Wisconsin
19th-century American politicians